The Schnebly Hill Formation is a section of red bed deposits found at the Colorado Plateau, near Sedona, Arizona. It lies between Coconino Sandstone and the older Hermit Formation. It is near the Supai Group.

The source of the name "Schnebly" is Sedona Schnebly, after whom the city of Sedona, Arizona, was named.

Geology

The formation traces to the Permian Age.

The formation is the most prominent layer of the red rocks of the Sedona area due the presence of hematite – iron-oxide, frankly, rust – giving the sandstone a red color. The Schnebly Hill Sandstone formation comprises three sections:

 the Bell Rock member, 
 the Fort Apache member, and 
 the Sycamore Pass member.

See also

Sedona-area rocks 

 Bell Rock
 Cathedral Rock
 Courthouse Butte
 Red Rock State Park
 Slide Rock State Park

Local geology 

 Colorado Plateau
 Mogollon Rim
 Supai Group

Local interest 

 Cottonwood, Arizona
 Honanki
 Jerome, Arizona
 Jerome State Historic Park
 Chapel of the Holy Cross
 Oak Creek Canyon
 Palatki Heritage Site
 Slide Rock State Park

References

External links and references

 Schnebly Hill Formation, a few images
 A hiking site on the Schnebly Hill Formation
 Travels in goeology, Sedona area
 How were Sedona's red rocks formed?
 Relationship between Schnebly Hill Formation and the Supai Group
 On YouTube video

Sedona, Arizona
Mogollon Rim
Colorado Plateau
Landforms of Coconino County, Arizona
Landforms of Yavapai County, Arizona